Orpelów  is a village in the administrative district of Gmina Dobroń, within Pabianice County, Łódź Voivodeship, in central Poland. In March 2011, the population was 763 with a density of 119.8 persons per km².

References

Villages in Pabianice County